Sugarloaf is a rhyolite dome located just below the San Francisco Peaks in Flagstaff, Arizona. It formed after the sideways eruption of the mountain, which occurred in a similar fashion  to the 1980 eruption of Mount St. Helens.

References

Mountains of Arizona
Cinder cones of the United States
Volcanoes of Arizona
Flagstaff, Arizona
Mountains of Coconino County, Arizona
North American 2000 m summits